Nuculoidea is a superfamily of bivalves. It belongs to the order Nuculida. It comprises one living family, Nuculidae and one extinct family Praenuculidae.

References

Nuculida
Mollusc superfamilies